The Lwiro shrew or Misotshi-Kabogo shrew (Crocidura lwiroensis) is a species of mammal in the family Soricidae. It is endemic to the Democratic Republic of the Congo.

Etymology 
It is named in honor of the research team based at the Lwiro (Centre National de Recherche Scientifique) biological research station north of Bukavu.

Distribution and habitat 
It is found in the Democratic Republic of the Congo, where it is restricted to a small portion of the Albertine Rift on the western shore of Lake Tanganyika. It is restricted to the Misotshi-Kabogo highlands, an isolated region of montane forest south of the Itombwe Mountains. The only known specimen was found along a creek in a primary forest.

Description 
It is very small in body size with a nearly naked tail. It has dark gray fur above and lighter gray fur below. It has a total length of 110 mm, a tail of 45 mm, and a weight of 5.6 g.

Status 
Although classified as Data Deficient due to lack of studies, it is likely threatened by deforestation for agricultural expansion, mining concessions, as well as an increase in local population from migration by refugees from the Kivu conflict, which may impact the ecosystem.

References 

Crocidura
Endemic fauna of the Democratic Republic of the Congo
Mammals of the Democratic Republic of the Congo
Mammals described in 2013